Mbara may refer to:

 Mbara language (Chad), a Chadic language
 Mbara language (Australia), an extinct Pama–Nyungan language

See also 
 Mbabaram language, a language of Australia
 Bambara language, a language of Mali